Tamara Kim "Tammy" Sutton-Brown (born January 27, 1978) is a Canadian retired professional basketball player. Her primary position was center. Throughout her playing career, Sutton-Brown played for the Charlotte Sting and Indiana Fever of the Women's National Basketball Association (WNBA). She had also played in Asia and Europe. Sutton-Brown has won a WNBA championship (2012) and is a two-time WNBA All-Star.

School years
Born in Markham, Ontario, Sutton-Brown was rated Canada's top female at Armadale public school basketball prospect by the Toronto Star.

College years
Sutton-Brown attended Rutgers University, where she majored in women's studies. As a senior, she was nicknamed Simba from the Disney movie "The Lion King" due to  her coming of age at Rutgers.  She owns a career field goal percentage of 57.6 which ranks third in the Rutgers career records.

WNBA career
Sutton-Brown was selected 18th overall in the second round of the 2001 WNBA draft by the Charlotte Sting. In her rookie season, Sutton-Brown experienced her first WNBA Finals appearance as the Sting advanced all the way to the WNBA Finals but were defeated in a 2-game sweep by the Los Angeles Sparks.

Sutton-Brown had a breakout year in her second season, averaging 11.9 ppg, 6.0 rpg and 1.1 bpg. Her season performance got her selected into the 2002 WNBA All-Star Game, becoming the first Canadian WNBA player to be voted as an all-star.

Sutton-Brown finished the 2004 season ranked second in the WNBA in blocks (a career-high 2.0 bpg). She became the Sting's all-time leader in blocks in 2004 with 196 career blocked shots, and as of 2006 only the 10th player to achieve 200 blocks.

After the 2006 season ended, the Sting ceased operations and most of the remaining players were entered in a dispersal draft that followed the Sting's demise. Since she was an unrestricted free agent at the end of the 2006 season, she was exempt from entering the dispersal draft. However, on March 22, 2007, she signed with the Indiana Fever. She would play alongside superstar forward Tamika Catchings.

During the 2007 season with the Fever, Sutton-Brown was selected into the 2007 WNBA All-Star Game and had averaged a career-high in scoring with 12 ppg.

In the 2009 season, Sutton-Brown experienced her second WNBA Finals appearance as the Fever advanced all the way to the WNBA Finals for the first time in franchise history, but fell short to the Phoenix Mercury in five games.

During her final season in the WNBA, Sutton-Brown became the fifth player in league history to accumulate 3,000 points, 2,000 rebounds and 400 blocks in their career. Later on in the season, Sutton-Brown won her first WNBA championship with the Fever in 2012 when they defeated the Minnesota Lynx 3-1 in the finals. Following the championship victory, Sutton-Brown became a free agent and eventually retired from the WNBA after 12 seasons. As of her retirement, Sutton-Brown ranks 22nd in career rebounds and 5th in career blocks.

WNBA career statistics

Regular season

|-
| align="left" | 2001
| align="left" | Charlotte
| 29 || 21 || 20.8 || .394 || .000 || .722 || 4.4 || 0.4 || 0.7 || 1.3 || 1.3 || 6.8
|-
| align="left" | 2002
| align="left" | Charlotte
| 32 || 29 || 27.7 || .531 || .000 || .713 || 6.0 || 0.5 || 0.9 || 1.1 || 1.5 || 11.9
|-
| align="left" | 2003
| align="left" | Charlotte
| 34 || 33 || 25.4 || .421 || .000 || .687 || 5.9 || 0.4 || 0.5 || 1.4 || 1.7 || 8.4
|-
| align="left" | 2004
| align="left" | Charlotte
| 34 || 34 || 28.5 || .473 || .000 || .698 || 6.2 || 0.4 || 0.9 || 2.0 || 2.0 || 9.6
|-
| align="left" | 2005
| align="left" | Charlotte
| 34 || 33 || 26.1 || .509 || .000 || .681 || 5.3 || 0.4 || 0.8 || 1.0 || 2.0 || 9.4
|-
| align="left" | 2006
| align="left" | Charlotte
| 30 || 30 || 26.7 || .488 || .000 || .639 || 5.9 || 0.7 || 0.8 || 1.8 || 2.3 || 11.2
|-
| align="left" | 2007
| align="left" | Indiana
| 34 || 33 || 25.3 || .485 || .000 || .716 || 5.4 ||0.9 || 1.0 || 1.3 || 2.5 || 12.0
|-
| align="left" | 2008
| align="left" | Indiana
| 33 || 33 || 29.0 || .495 || .000 || .673 || 6.3 || 0.5 || 0.6 || 1.7 || 2.0 || 11.8
|-
| align="left" | 2009
| align="left" | Indiana
| 27 || 25 || 25.2 || .466 || .000 || .745 || 5.9 || 0.9 || 0.5 || 1.4 || 1.8 || 9.9
|-
| align="left" | 2010
| align="left" | Indiana
| 34 || 34 || 25.7 || .450 || .000|| .707 || 5.1 || 0.9 || 0.9 || 1.6 || 1.6 || 8.1
|-
| align="left" | 2011
| align="left" | Indiana
| 34 || 26 || 19.0 || .489 || .000 || .743 || 3.1 || 0.6 || 1.0 || 1.2 || 0.9 || 5.5
|-
|style="text-align:left;background:#afe6ba;"|2012†
| align="left" | Indiana
| 33 || 32 || 16.4 || .422 || .000 || .800 || 2.8 || 0.7 || 0.7 || 0.8 || 0.6 || 3.9
|-
| align="left" | Career
| align="left" |12 years, 2 teams
| 388 || 363 || 24.7 || .479 || .000 || .700 || 5.2 || 0.6 || 0.8 || 1.4 || 1.7 || 9.0

Postseason

|-
| align="left" | 2001
| align="left" | Charlotte
| 8 || 8 || 20.9 || .543 || .000 || .714 || 3.3 || 0.5 || 0.1 || 1.3 || 1.0 || 7.5
|-
| align="left" | 2002
| align="left" | Charlotte
| 2 || 2 || 28.0 || .500 || .000 || .167 || 6.0 || 0.0 || 0.5 || 0.5 || 3.5 || 7.5
|-
| align="left" | 2003
| align="left" | Charlotte
| 2 || 1 || 16.0 || .286 || .000 || .000 || 3.0 || 0.0 || 0.0 || 1.5 || 1.0 || 2.0
|-
| align="left" | 2007
| align="left" | Indiana
| 6 || 6 || 20.5 || .349 || .000 || .571 || 4.7 || 0.7 || 0.1 || 2.0 || 1.3 || 7.0
|-
| align="left" | 2008
| align="left" | Indiana
| 3 || 3 || 31.0 || .387 || .000 || .952 || 5.3 || 0.3 || 0.3 || 1.3 || 2.0 || 14.7
|-
| align="left" | 2009
| align="left" | Indiana
| 10 || 10 || 31.1 || .528 || .000 || .689 || 5.6 || 0.5 || 0.9 ||1.4 || 3.0 || 14.3
|-
| align="left" | 2010
| align="left" | Indiana
| 3 || 3 || 30.0 || .476 || .000 || .818 || 4.3 || 0.3 || 1.3 || 0.6 || 2.6 || 9.7
|-
| align="left" | 2011
| align="left" | Indiana
| 6 || 6 || 28.7 || .463 || .000 || .864 || 6.8 || 1.3 || 0.8 || 1.8|| 2.6 || 9.5
|-
|style="text-align:left;background:#afe6ba;"| 2012†
| align="left" | Indiana
| 7 || 1 || 8.6 || .571 || .000 || .444 || 2.0 || 0.4 || 0.2 || 0.1 || 0.4 || 3.4
|-
| align="left" | Career
| align="left" |9 years, 2 teams
| 47 || 40 || 23.5 || .477 || .000 || .696 || 4.5 || 0.6 || 0.5 || 1.3 || 1.9 || 8.9

Overseas career
Sutton-Brown's first season overseas was in Korea where she played for the Kumho Life Falcons in 2001–02 off-season. In the 2002–03 off-season, Sutton-Brown played for VBM-SGAU Samara in Russia. In the 2003–04 off-season, Sutton-Brown returned to Korea to play for the Kumho Life Falcons and won a championship with the team. In the 2004–05 off-season, Sutton-Brown played for USK Prague in Czech Republic and spent the rest of the off-season playing for VBM-SGAU Samara and Dynamo Moscow. Sutton-Brown played for Fenerbahçe since the start of the 2006–07 off-season for 5 years where she won five championships.

Turkish Women's Basketball League (5) : 2006–07, 2007–08, 2008–09, 2009–10, 2010–11
Turkish Cup (3): 2006–07, 2007–08, 2008–09
Turkish President Cup (2): 2006–07, 2009–10
EuroLeague Women
Quarter-Final (4): 2006–07, 2007–08, 2008–09, 2009–10
EuroCup Women
Runners-up (1): 2004–05
Fourth (1): 2003–04
Women's Korean Basketball League
WKBL champion (1): 2003–04

International clubs
  USK Prague
 Dynamo Moscow
 VBM-SGAU Samara
 Kumho Life Falcons
 Fenerbahçe Istanbul

International career
Sutton-Brown played for the Canada women's national basketball team in the 2000 Summer Olympics. She averaged 10.3 ppg and 7.3 rpg in 6 games with the team throughout the Olympics.

Philanthropy
During her playing career, Sutton-Brown had started up The Tammy Sutton-Brown Foundation, a charitable organization that specializes in the needs of less fortunate women and the self-awareness of female children.

Life after basketball
Since her retirement from professional basketball, Sutton-Brown launched TSquared, a marketing company that partners up professional athletes with various brands. She also became an author and is working on a series of children’s books.

References

External links

Unofficial Rutgers Resume
Player Profile at fenerbahce.org
March 22, 2007 Press release on signing with the Indiana Fever

1978 births
Living people
Basketball players at the 2000 Summer Olympics
Basketball people from Ontario
Black Canadian basketball players
Canadian expatriate basketball people in Russia
Canadian expatriate basketball people in Turkey
Canadian expatriate basketball people in the United States
Canadian expatriate sportspeople in the Czech Republic
Canadian women's basketball players
Centers (basketball)
Charlotte Sting players
Fenerbahçe women's basketball players
Indiana Fever players
Olympic basketball players of Canada
Rutgers Scarlet Knights women's basketball players
Sportspeople from Markham, Ontario
Women's National Basketball Association All-Stars